CHGB may refer to:

 CHGB-FM, a radio station (97.7 FM) licensed to Wasaga Beach, Ontario, Canada
 CHGB, a former AM station in La Pocatière, Quebec, which became CHOX-FM in 1990
 CHGB (gene)
 Chinese National Human Genome Center, Beijing